General Parke may refer to:

John Parke (1827–1900), Union Army major general
Thomas Parke (Royal Marines officer) (1780–1858), Royal Marines general
William Parke (British Army officer) (1822–1897), British Army general

See also
Cecil Park (British Army officer) (1885–1913), British Army major general
Floyd Lavinius Parks (1896–1959), U.S. Army lieutenant general
Garry L. Parks (born 1947), U.S. Marine Corps lieutenant general